The Bryan Davies Show is an Australian television series which aired from 1962 to 1963 on ABC. The 60-minute series was produced in Sydney, and was a music show starring singer Bryan Davies. Regulars included the Don Burrows Sextet and the Alan Dean Singers. The archival status of the series is not known, given the varied survival rates of ABC programming of the 1960s.

See also
Six O'Clock Rock

References

External links
The Bryan Davies Show on IMDb

1962 Australian television series debuts
1963 Australian television series endings
Black-and-white Australian television shows
English-language television shows
Australian variety television shows
Australian Broadcasting Corporation original programming